The Man in the Hat is a 2020 British independent comedy film, the directorial debut of composer Stephen Warbeck. The film is a musically-rooted road trip comedy. The film was made by Open Palm Films and Rather Good Films Ltd and is represented by Kaleidoscope Film Distribution.

The film was released in United Kingdom cinemas on 18 September 2020.

Ciarán Hinds said in an interview with RTÉ "This won't take too much of your time. And you don't need to be blown out of your seats; you can just be a human being and watch this little journey and feel things. It has its own heartbeat, unlike anything else".

The Guardian called the film "a Francophile fantasy" and "a whimsical French car chase". The Upcoming gave the film 4 Stars calling it "a perfect example of the kind of pleasant diversion one should seek during these trying times".

Cast
 Ciarán Hinds as The Thin Man
 Stephen Dillane  as The Damp Man
 Maïwenn  as The Biker
 Brigitte Roüan  as The Hotel Manager
 Sasha Hails as The Woman
 Muna Otaru as The Chef 
 Mark Padmore as The Singing Man

References

External links
 
 

2020 films
2020 comedy films
2020 independent films
2020s comedy road movies
2020s French-language films
British comedy road movies
Films set in France
2020s English-language films
2020 multilingual films
British multilingual films
2020s British films